Dīkṣitars (Tamil: தீக்ஷிதர்)  or Thillai Vazh Anthaanar are a Vedic Shaiva Brahmin servitor community of Tamil Nadu who are based mainly in the town of Chidambaram. Smartha (especially the Vadamas), Sri Vaishnava and other Brahmins in South India also carry the surname Dikshitars, but are different from the Chidambaram Dishitar.

They are an exclusive group of Brahmins learned in the Vedas and Yagnas (sacrifices) who also serve as the hereditary trustees of the Nataraja temple in Chidambaram. They are also called Thillai Muvayiravar or the Three Thousand of Thillai Every Dikshitar once he is married becomes as of right a trustee and archaka of the Nataraja temple. A practice unique to the community is that the priests wear the tuft of hair in front of the head similar to the Nambuthiri Brahmans of Kerala.

History
The Dikshithars might be traced back to the first line of Brahmanas who migrated to South India from the north, this migration happened as the result of the increasing spread of Jainism and Buddhism in the North.The establishment of Mauryan, Satavahana and Kadamba rule in South India also necessitated the movement of Brahmans into the new regions because these kingdom required trained ritualists.
They are mentioned in the 12th century work, the Periyapuranam of Sekkizhar. They were originally the ritual arbiters of imperial legitimacy in the Chola Empire, ritually crowning successive monarchs. This honour was reserved only for rulers belonging to the Chola dynasty. When Kutruva Nayanar, a chieftain of Kalandai became very powerful as a result of his conquests, he requested the 3000 of Tillai to crown him as king of the Chola country but they declined saying that they would only crown a Chola and instead fled to the Chera country to escape his wrath.

It is also of interest to note that Kulottunga Chola I, during his rule, introduced priests from Vengi, his original homeland, to perpetuate the myth of the Tillai three thousand in order to legitimize his royal and priestly power.

See also
Dikshit, a Hindu family name

References

See also
 Dikshit

Tamil Brahmins